Taft Reed (born June 12, 1942) is a former American football defensive back. He played for the Philadelphia Eagles in 1967.

References

1942 births
Living people
American football defensive backs
Jackson State Tigers football players
Philadelphia Eagles players